The Italian Society on General Relativity and Gravitation (SIGRAV), founded in 1990 
, is a non-profit association whose purpose is that of bringing together members belonging to the Italian scientific community who are interested in the various aspects of general relativity and in gravitation physics.

SIGRAV therefore brings together experts and researchers involved in classical and quantum gravity, astrophysics, relativistic cosmology and experimental gravity, organizing biennial national congresses.

Other relevant activities are managing the SIGRAV School and the Virgo School. At the time of the national congress it awards the SIGRAV prizes and the Amaldi medal.

List of the presidents

The following list includes both the honorary as well as the elected ones, ordered according to appointment year.

Honorary presidents

Tullio Regge

Four year term presidents

Mauro Francaviglia, 1992-1996
Pietro Fré, 1996-2000
Eugenio Coccia, 2000-2004
Luca Lusanna, 2004-2008
Mauro Francaviglia, 2008-2012
Salvatore Capozziello, 2012-2018
Fulvio Ricci, 2018-2022
 Stefano Liberati, 2022-

Location
SIGRAV's address is  viale F. Crispi, in L'Aquila, based at the Gran Sasso Science Institute (GSSI).

Amaldi medals

European Prize for Gravitational Physics “Edoardo Amaldi” 
The Prize, consisting in a gold medal valued about 10KEuro (whenever the Prize is not shared), is reserved to scientists who carry out their activity in Europe and have given important contributions to the Physics of Gravitation. The Prize will be awarded every two years, following the indications of the SIGRAV Board, during the SIGRAV National Conferences.

 2004 Roger Penrose
 2006 Bernard Schutz
 2008 Sergio Ferrara
 2010 Thibault Damour
 2012 Viatcheslav Mukhanov and Alexei Starobinsky
 2014 Nazzareno Mandolesi and Sergei Odintsov
 2016 Guido Pizzella and Adalberto Giazotto

SIGRAV Prizes

Two “SIGRAV Prizes”  for “Classical and Quantum Gravity” and “Astrophysics, Cosmology and Experimental Gravity” are awarded by SIGRAV every two years, to young Italian scientists of age not exceeding 40 at the time of the nomination, who have given relevant contributions to General Relativity and Gravitational Physics.

List of the recipients for “Classical and Quantum Gravity” 

 1994 Massimo Bianchi, Augusto Sagnotti
 1998  Massimo Porrati
 2000 Alberto Zaffaroni
 2002 Massimo Giovannini
 2004 Carlo Angelantonj
 2006 Claudio Dappiaggi
 2008 Gianguido Dall’Agata 
 2010 Dario Martelli, Alessandro Tomasiello
 2012 Fabrizio Canfora, Dario Francia
 2014 Simone Giombi
 2016 Paolo Pani

List of the recipients for “Astrophysics, Cosmology and Experimental Gravity” 

 1994 Pietro Tricarico
 1998 Gabriele Ghisellini
 2000 Alessandra Buonanno, Luigi Stella, Mario Vietri
 2002 Livia Conti, Viviana Fafone, Alberto Vecchio
 2004 Giovanni Miniutti
 2006 Claudio Dappiaggi
 2008 Michele Vallisneri
 2010 Rosalba Perna
 2012 Mariafelicia De Laurentis
 2014 Michele Liguori, Giovanni Marozzi, Giulia Pagliaroli
 2016 Marco Drago, Enrico Barausse

References

External links
SIGRAV website

Scientific societies based in Italy
Physics societies
Scientific organizations established in 1990